A number of ships of the French Navy have borne the name Eylau, in honour of the Battle of Eylau:

 , an 80-gun 
 , a 100-gun , converted to steam while still on keel.

French Navy ship names